John Joseph Wright (July 18, 1909 – August 10, 1979) was an American cardinal of the Roman Catholic Church. He served as Prefect of the Congregation for the Clergy from 1969 until his death, and was elevated to the cardinalate in 1969.

Biography

Early life and ordination
John Joseph Wright was born in Dorchester, Massachusetts, to John and Harriet (née Cokely) Wright. While attending Boston Latin School, he worked at the Hyde Park branch of the Boston Public Library as stack boy in the evenings and summers.
He also financed his studies by working for The Boston Post.

Wright graduated from Boston College in 1931, and then entered St. John's Seminary in Brighton. At the end of his first year at St. John's, he was sent to Rome to study at the Pontifical North American College and the Pontifical Gregorian University. He was ordained to the priesthood by Cardinal Francesco Marchetti Selvaggiani on December 8, 1935, in the chapel of the North American College.

As a child he listened to World War I soldiers talking about France and became fascinated with the country. He took unpaid parish work in Scotland, England and France, where he took a parish in the Dordogne and learned the folk songs and poetry.

Professor
After his ordination he did graduate work at the Gregorian, earning his Licentiate of Sacred Theology in 1936 and his Doctorate of Sacred Theology in 1939. Wright taught philosophy and theology at his alma mater of St. John's Seminary until 1943, when he was appointed private secretary to the Cardinal William Henry O'Connell of Boston. Wright continued in this position under O'Connell's successor, future Cardinal Richard Cushing, and was raised to the rank of Monsignor on December 17, 1944.

Auxiliary bishop of Boston and Bishop of Worcester
On May 10, 1947, he was appointed Auxiliary Bishop of Boston and Titular Bishop of Aegeae. Wright received his episcopal consecration on the following June 30 from Archbishop Cushing, with Bishops Ralph Hayes and James Connelly serving as co-consecrators, in the Cathedral of the Holy Cross. Wright was later named the first Bishop of Worcester on January 28, 1950. In this position, he criticized both Utopians and doom-sayers, and said that an exemplary Christian "[recognizes] the vast errors of which human nature is capable... but [knows] that grace is stronger than sin". A member of the Mariological Society of America, he hosted at Worcester the group's 1950 convention

Bishop of Pittsburgh
Wright became the eighth Bishop of Pittsburgh on January 23, 1959, and then attended the Second Vatican Council (1962–65), during which he was a decisive force behind several of its documents. Following the Council's advancements in ecumenism, he believed that an "immediate unity in good works and charity" would arise between Catholics and Protestants. In 1961, Wright opened the Bishop's Latin School as the pre-seminary high school of the diocese. It operated through 1973.

Wright was also known to promote music and culture during his time in Pittsburgh, befriending the African-American Catholic composer Mary Lou Williams, commissioning her to perform a Jazz Mass at a local Catholic school, and helping her to establish the Pittsburgh Jazz Festival.

Congregation for the Clergy
Pope Paul VI appointed Wright as the Prefect of the Congregation for the Clergy, and thus the highest-ranking American in the Roman Curia, on April 23, 1969.

Cardinal
He was created Cardinal Priest of Gesù Divin Maestro alla Pineta Sacchetti by Pope Paul in the consistory of April 28, 1969. Wright was one of the four cardinals who travelled to Auschwitz in 1972 for a memorial of Maximilian Kolbe; besides John Krol, he was the only other American cardinal to visit Poland.

Wright did not participate in the August 1978 conclave because he was recovering from surgery, but he was one of the cardinal electors in the conclave of the following October, which selected Pope John Paul II.

Death 
Wright died from polymyositis in Cambridge, Massachusetts, at age 70. He is buried in Holyhood Cemetery in Brookline, Massachusetts.

Views 
He was an intellectual who was liberal on social issues, but conservative in theology. He espoused civil rights and condemned the Vietnam War, but opposed ordination of women and birth control. He believed that annual Synods of Bishops would be useless and burdenful, and that seven years was the appropriate age for children to receive the Sacrament of Penance, as it might be thus able to correct sinful behavior at an early age. He also believed that Pope John Paul I would be "a witty Pontiff who delights in combining love of literature with love of the words of God."

Legacy
St. Pope John Paul II, five days after Wright's death, pointed to his life as "an existence which was spent totally for Christ and his Church," and that Wright was "always faithful to his motto: Resonare Christum corde Romano (Echo Christ with a Roman heart). That really sums up his whole life" as he had a "sensus Ecclessiae which was second nature to him."

Archbishop Alberto Bovone, who worked as the undersecretary of Cardinal Wright, wrote of the characteristic features of his personality: strong, exuberant joviality, who gave wise and humorous contributions during meetings; saw himself as the Pope's soldier, with a combatant's temperament; an ardent and indefatigable worker, who was reluctant to rest when involved in a project; generous towards his friends and co-workers, giving them gifts as tokens of affection; love for the Faith that led him to correct theological errors of the media and to be upset at theologians who superimposed their opinion over sacred doctrine, while being indulgent towards persons who admitted their mistakes.

In 1998, Wright's namesake was given to Cardinal Wright Elementary School, a Catholic elementary school formed through the merger of St. Aloysious School in Reserve Township, Most Holy Name of Jesus School in Troy Hill, and St. Peter School in the Central North Side. The school was in existence until its closure in 2011, when it was merged with Northside Catholic School. 

The John Cardinal Wright Award is given to those in the Pittsburgh Catholic Diocese who have made a significant contribution in fulfilling the mission of the church through working with youth and young adults.

References

Sources

External links
 Cardinals of the Holy Roman Church
 Roman Catholic Diocese of Pittsburgh History of Bishops webpage

1909 births
1979 deaths
American Roman Catholic clergy of Irish descent
20th-century American cardinals
Roman Catholic bishops of Pittsburgh
Participants in the Second Vatican Council
Prefects of the Congregation for the Clergy
Cardinals created by Pope Paul VI
Clergy from Boston
Boston College alumni
Roman Catholic bishops of Worcester, Massachusetts
Burials at Holyhood Cemetery (Brookline)
The Boston Post people
Catholics from Massachusetts